The Afghanistan women's national volleyball team represents Afghanistan in international women's volleyball competitions and friendly matches.

References
Volleyball - Afghanistan (Women) - Profile on The-Sports.org

Videos
 Afghan National Women's Volleyball Team vs. ISAF YouTube.com video

National women's volleyball teams
Volleyball
Volleyball in Afghanistan